Georg Løkkeberg (20 November 1909 – 19 August 1986) was a Norwegian actor and theatre director. He appeared in 29 films between 1934 and 1978. He starred in the film The Master and His Servants, which was entered into the 9th Berlin International Film Festival.

Selected filmography

  Sinners in Summertime (1934)
  Song of Rondane (1934)
  Vi bygger landet (1936)
  By og land hand i hand (1937)
  Mot nya tider (1939)
  Familien på Borgan (1939)
 Whalers (1939)
 Emilie Högquist (1939)
Bastard (1940)
 The Three of Us (1940)
  Rikard Nordraak (1945)
 Woman in White (1949)
 In the Arms of the Sea (1951)
 House of Women (1953)
  The Master and His Servants (1959)
 Et øye på hver finger (1961)
 Hans Nielsen Hauge (1961)
  De ukjentes marked (1968)
  Autumn Sonata (1978)

References

External links

1909 births
1986 deaths
Norwegian male film actors
Norwegian male stage actors
Norwegian theatre directors
People from Fredrikstad
20th-century Norwegian male actors
Norwegian resistance members